Ortalia horni is a species of lady beetle native to India and Sri Lanka.

Description
Body length is about 2.5 mm. Body is short oval, and moderately convex. Prothorax very finely greyish and shiny with punctures.

References 

Coccinellidae
Insects of Sri Lanka
Beetles described in 1900